Ruin is the second studio album by British metalcore band Architects. It was released on 25 October 2007 through United by Fate, Distort and Century Media Records. The album was produced by John Mitchell, Ben Humphreys and the band themselves. It is the first album to feature vocalist Sam Carter and bassist Alex Dean.

Composition

Style
Stylistically, this album displays a minor change in the band's style, with a more fluid metalcore sound. Clean vocals are implemented again in a few songs, to a larger extent than on Nightmares, although not as prominently as in later releases. The album features a change in guitar tuning, from drop C (which was used on Nightmares) to drop B, for all tracks, except "Low", which features the same tuning as drop B, but with the low B tuned to F# (the bass string on an eight string guitar).

Ruin was the first Architects album to feature new vocalist Sam Carter. His vocal style is quite different to that of previous vocalist Matt Johnson, marking a shift from screaming towards hardcore punk-style shouting. This is most obvious on the 2008 re-recording of "To the Death" (from Nightmares) that was available for download for a short period.

Track listing

Personnel
Writing, performance and production credits are adapted from the album liner notes.

Architects
 Sam Carter – lead vocals
 Tom Searle – lead guitar, keyboards, programming
 Tim Hillier-Brook – rhythm guitar
 Alex "Ali" Dean – bass
 Dan Searle – drums, percussion, programming

Additional musicians
 Nick Worthington of Dead Swans – guest vocals on the bonus track "Broken Clocks"

Additional personnel
 Architects – production
 John Mitchell – production, engineering, mixing
 Ben Humphreys – production, engineering
 Tim Turan – mastering
 Greg Below – A&R
 Seldon Hunt – artwork design, layout

References

External links
 

2007 albums
Architects (British band) albums
Distort Entertainment albums
Century Media Records albums